The Penza Recluses (True Russian Orthodox Church, TROC) was an Independent Russian doomsday cult founded by Pyotr Kuznetsov which borrowed some ideas from Eastern Orthodoxy. The self-name of the group was "Heavenly Jerusalem". This group broke away from the Russian Orthodox Church, considering it insufficiently orthodox. Its members were not allowed to eat processed food, watch television or handle money. They rejected bar codes, National identification number and passports because they contained satanic symbols ("the number of the Beast").

In November 2007, between 29 and 35 members of the group holed themselves up in a cave in Russia's Penza region, near the village Nikolskoye, threatening mass suicide if authorities tried to intervene. Kuznetsov had told them to hide themselves away to await the end of the world, which he predicted would take place in May 2008. Kuznetsov himself was not with the group, but had been placed under police arrest.

On March 28, 2008, seven women who had holed up in a cave for months were being treated by emergency workers, regional officials said. Three days later 14 members emerged from the cave after melting snow caused part of the cave to collapse.

On April 3, 2008, Kuznetsov was taken to a hospital where "Officials said that he may have attempted suicide after realising his prediction had been wrong." In subsequent years, he was in a psychiatric ward with a diagnosis of paranoia. In 2016, the court once again extended the period of his compulsory treatment at the request of the Chief of the regional psychiatric clinic.

On May 16, 2008, the last nine members of the cult emerged from the bunker due to the toxic fumes produced by two cult members who had died over winter. On May 21, after removing the bodies of the dead, the cave was blown up. Officially, it was done because of its danger to local population and curious visitors.

After leaving the cave, most of the sect members left the village, except for one family. Several people moved to a deaf village in Belarus. Vasily Nedogon, head of the family remaining in Nikolskoye, in 2012 continued to live with his wife and three children without electricity and passports; he still waited that the end time will come soon.

References

External links 
 Stench of rotting corpses drives Russian doomsday group from cave on Wikinews

Christian new religious movements
Independent Eastern Orthodox denominations
Eastern Orthodoxy in Russia
Apocalyptic groups
2008 in Russia